Orlando Aloysius Battista (June 20, 1917 – October 3, 1995) was a Canadian-American chemist and author.  He was known in particular for his inventions and patents.

Biography
Battista was born in Cornwall, Ontario, Canada, as the seventh of eight children. His father was a long-time Canadian government employee. As a child, he was an altar boy and earned money via shoveling snow and a newspaper route. He began writing at the age of twelve, after saving enough money to buy a typewriter.  Battista graduated from McGill University with a degree in chemistry.

Battista published scientific papers and books to bring chemistry to laypeople throughout his career.

A devout Catholic, he did not shy away from advertising his religious beliefs as well as his scientific ones.

Quotes

“An error doesn't become a mistake until you refuse to correct it.”
“The best inheritance a parent can give his children is a few minutes of his time each day.”

Works

Books
 How to Enjoy Work and Get More Fun Out of Life (1957)
 God's World and You (1957)
 Fundamentals of High Polymers (1958)
 The Challenge of Chemistry (1959) Illustrated by Gil Cohen.
 The Power to Influence People (1959)
 Mental Drugs; Chemistry's Challenge to Psychotherapy (1960)
 Common Science in Everyday Life (1960)
 Toward the Conquest of Cancer (1961)
 Synthetic Fibers in Papermaking (1964)
 A Dictionary of Quotations (1966)
 Childish Questions (1973) With Helen Keffer Battista. Illustrated by Keiko Couch.
 Research for Profit (1974)
 Microcrystal Polymer Science (1975)
 People Power (1977)
 O. A. Battista's Quotations : A Speaker's Dictionary (1977)
 Olympiad of Knowledge—1984 (1981)
 Amazing Habits of Ants

Awards
 Awarded an honorary Doctor of Science degree by St. Vincent College in 1955.
 Awarded the Anselme Payen Award by the American Chemical Society Cellulose and Renewable Materials Division in 1985.
 The American Chemical Society held a symposium honoring Battista on April 9, 1987 in Denver, Colorado.

Footnotes

1917 births
1995 deaths
Canadian chemists
Canadian non-fiction writers
Canadian Roman Catholics
People from Cornwall, Ontario
Writers from Ontario
20th-century non-fiction writers
Canadian emigrants to the United States
Presidents of the American Institute of Chemists